Private Snafu vs. Malaria Mike is an animated short film, directed by Chuck Jones and first released in March, 1944. It features Private Snafu facing a malaria-transmitting mosquito.

Plot 
The film opens to a wanted poster of Malaria Mike, the mosquito, placed on a tree. The surrounding area is a swamp. Mike himself admires his image in the poster, though he is not satisfied with the depiction of his nose. A splash of water alerts Mike to the presence of a potential target for him: the naked backside of Snafu. The soldier is currently bathing in a stream. Mike consults a chart detailing the choice parts of an American soldier. The buttocks are identified as filet mignon in the chart. Examining the buttocks of Snafu, Mike recognizes the man. Claiming to never forget a face. Mike reads the dog tags of Snafu and is enthusiastic to learn that the soldier is blood type A, his favorite type.

As Snafu dresses, Mike follows Snafu around and attempts to assault him. Various movements and clothing protect Snafu as time passes. In one occasion, Mike misses his target and infects a nearby tree with malaria. It promptly shrivels up and dies. Finally Snafu makes a mistake by rising from his camp bed with his backside nude. While kissing a photo of his girlfriend, his nude rear is offered as a target to Mike. The snout of the mosquito finally hits the mark.

Some time later, Mike is depicted sitting at an easy chair with a son sitting on his knee. The inquisitive boy asks what his father did in the "great war". The camera provides the answer by shifting to a nearby fireplace and to a trophy head mounted above it, the head of Snafu. In a postscript, Snafu thanks his sponsors, the United States Army. He credits them as providers of insect repellent, mosquito nets, atabrine tablets, and horse sense. He wishes he had actually used them.

Context 

In the Pacific War, the lack of mosquito control measures had caused malaria to reach epidemic status. Entire infected units had to be evacuated before actually experiencing combat. Early in the War, it was estimated that malaria caused eight to ten times as many casualties than the battlefield. In 1943, James C. Magee, Surgeon General of the United States Army, created special units to plan and carry out malaria control. The same year, Douglas MacArthur issued orders concerning malaria control measures. Among them was raising the shipping priority of anti-malaria supplies, providing troops with prophylactic drugs (quinine and atabrine) and mosquito repellents, and training troops in the importance of malaria.

Soldiers were reluctant to take antimalarials (particularly Atabrine, which had worse side-effects than quinine) because of the side-effects, and Private SNAFU vs. Malaria Mike was an attempt to challenge this aversion.

Also in 1943, the United States Army started issuing educational propaganda about malaria. The educational campaign included films, radio broadcasts, posters, pinup calendars, signs, manuals, matchbooks, ration containers, and maps, all warning soldiers to protect themselves from malaria infection. This animated short film was part of the wider campaign.

Some of the Private Snafu films reused animation from mainstream films of Warner Bros. Cartoons. The air raid-like climax of the film derives from The Fighting 69th ½ (1941).

Notes 
Although Mike is a male mosquito, in reality it's only the females that bite (which would later be corrected in a later Private Snafu cartoon, It's Murder She Says which is also directed by Chuck Jones), while the males only drink nectar and plant juice.

Sources

References

External links
 

1944 films
1944 animated films
Animated films about insects
Short films directed by Chuck Jones
Private Snafu
Films scored by Carl Stalling
Films produced by Leon Schlesinger
1944 comedy films
1940s Warner Bros. animated short films
Films about mosquitoes